Kim Shushun (born January 24, 1979), also known as Kin Hidetoshi, Kim Shujun, or Kim Sujun, is a professional Go player.

Biography 
Kim became a professional in 1996. In 2007, he was promoted to 8 dan. His teacher is Cho Chikun. He made it to the final of the 16th NEC Shun-Ei, only to be beaten by Mizokami Tomochika. Coincidentally, he played the game on the same day as his teacher, Cho Chikun, played in the final of the NEC Cup. He won his 400th career game in 2006.

Titles & runners-up

Promotion record

See also
 Go players

References

External links
 Nihon Ki-in profile 

1979 births
Living people
South Korean Go players